Ronald Leighton (24 January 1930 – 28 February 1994) was a British Labour Party politician.

Political career
Leighton contested Middleton and Prestwich at the 1964 general election, but was beaten by the Conservative incumbent Sir John Barlow. At the February 1974 election he fought the new Horsham and Crawley seat, but was defeated by the Conservative Peter Hordern.

He became an MP in 1979 by regaining Newham North East for his party; it had been the seat of Reg Prentice, who during the previous Parliament had defected from Labour to the Conservatives. Leighton was opposed to British membership of the European Communities, and was Director of the Common Market Safeguards Campaign from 1970 to 1972.

He retained the seat until he died in office, aged 64, in 1994; at the subsequent by-election, the seat was held for Labour by Stephen Timms.

A road in the London Borough of Newham was named after Leighton. Ron Leighton Way allows through traffic to bypass the busy East Ham High Street.

Notes

References
Times Guide to the House of Commons, Times Newspapers Ltd, 1979 and 1992 editions.

1930 births
1994 deaths
Graphical, Paper and Media Union-sponsored MPs
Labour Party (UK) MPs for English constituencies
UK MPs 1979–1983
UK MPs 1983–1987
UK MPs 1987–1992
UK MPs 1992–1997